Goldschmidt Cirque is a cirque at the west side of the Trueman Terraces in the eastern portion of the Read Mountains, Shackleton Range, Antarctica. It was photographed from the air by the U.S. Navy, 1967, and was surveyed by the British Antarctic Survey, 1968–71. In association with the names of geologists grouped in this area, it was named by the UK Antarctic Place-Names Committee after Victor M. Goldschmidt, a Norwegian geochemist and pioneer in the field of crystal chemistry.

References

Cirques of Coats Land